The Catholicate of Abkhazia was a subdivision of the Georgian Orthodox Church that existed as an independent entity in western Georgia from the 1470s to 1814. It was headed by the Catholicos (later, Catholicos Patriarch), officially styled as the Catholicos Patriarch of Imereti, Odishi, Ponto-Abkhaz-Guria, Racha-Lechkhum-Svaneti, Ossetians, Dvals, and all of the North. The residence of the Catholicoi was at Bichvinta (now Pitsunda) in Abkhazia (hence, the name of the Catholicate), but was moved to the Gelati Monastery in Imereti in the late 16th century. In 1814, the office of the Catholicos of Abkhazia was abolished by the Russian Empire which would take control of the Georgian church until 1917.

History 
  
The date when the Catholicate of Abkhazia was established is not completely clear with some scholars dating it to the 9th or 10th centuries. Retrieved on May 2, 2007. Approximately at that time Abkhazian bishoprics changed allegiance from Constantinople to Mtskheta. The titular Catholicoi of Abkhazia were mentioned in the contemporary sources for the first time in 11th century and likely did not enjoy independence at that time.  The first written account on the Catholicate of Abkhazia dates to 1290 and some scholars date its founding to the 13th century. By that time, the Mongol rule had divided Georgia into its eastern and western parts, with the latter being de facto independent from the Mongol Ilkhanid dynasty, to which Georgia was a subject. The political independence of the western Georgian rulers, Kings of Imereti, might have also resulted in the revival of the Catholicate of Abkhazia, but it was not until the late 15th century, when it emerged as an independent religious entity. This is usually associated with the consecration of Archbishop Joachime of Tsaish and Bedia, as Catholicos of Abkhazia by Michael IV, the Patriarch of Antioch, during the rule of the Imeretian king Bagrat VI (1463-1478). To justify the break with the Mtskheta see, Michael issued a special document, The Law of Faith, in which he stated that western and eastern Georgia had different histories of conversion and, therefore, they should be independent from each other.
  
Thus, the Catholicoi of Abkhazia became independent and later assumed the title of Patriarch. Their spiritual jurisdiction extended over the Kingdom of Imereti and its vassal principalities – Guria, Mingrelia, Svaneti, and Abkhazia. They considered themselves as vicars of St. Andrew, who, according to a medieval Georgian tradition, preached Christianity in western Georgia, then known to the Classical authors as Colchis. At various periods of its existence, the Catholicate of Abkhazia was subdivided into several dioceses (eparchies), including those of Bichvinta, Kutaisi, Gelati, Tsageri, Tsaishi, Tsalenjikha, Chkondidi, Khoni, Ninotsminda, Nikortsminda, Shemokmedi, Jumati, Dranda, Bedia and Mokvi, centered on the respective cathedrals.

In the latter part of the 16th century, Catholicos Patriarch Eudemos I (Chkheidze) had to move his residence from Bichvinta to the Gelati Monastery at Kutaisi, fleeing the Ottoman expansion into Abkhazia. Eudemos launched a series of important reforms and restored a communion with the Patriarchate of Georgia, retaining his status of an independent prelate, however. The Catholicoi of Abkhazia mostly came from the leading Georgian noble houses, and were able to support the church financially and secure its continuous involvement in the political and cultural life of western Georgia. However, the Islamization of Abkhazia, Adjara, and Lower Guria under the Ottoman rule delivered a hard blow to the Catholicate. The close cooperation between the royal dynasty and the church in the late 18th century resulted in the revival of Christianity in Guria, and a portion of Abkhazia. After the conquest of Imereti by Imperial Russia in 1810, the Catholicate of Abkhazia was also abolished, in 1814, by the Russian authorities and annexed to the Exarchate of Georgia, a subdivision of the Russian Orthodox Church, whose part it was until the restoration of the unified and autocephalous Georgian Orthodox Church in 1917.

In 2009 the Abkhazian Orthodox Church was established as a continuation of the Catholicate of Abkhazia, though this church remains today (2019) as noncanonical within the Eastern Orthodox Church.

Catholicoi of Abkhazia 

Nicholas (latter part of the 13th century)
Arsenius (c. 1390)
Daniel (late 14th century)
Joachim (1470s)
Stephan (1490-1516)
Malachia I Abashidze (1519-1540)
Eudemios I Chkhetidze (1557-1578)
Euthymius I Sakvarelidze (1578-1616)
Malachia II Gurieli (1616-1639)
Gregory I (1639)
Maxim I Machutasdze (1639-1657)
Zachary Kvariani (1657-1660)
Simeon I Chkhetidze (1660-1666)
Eudemios II Sakvarelidze (1666-1669)
Euthymius II Sakvarelidze (1669-1673)
David Nemsadze (1673-1696)
Gregory II Lordkipanidze (1696-1742)
German Tsulukidze (1742-1751)
Bessarion Eristavi (1751-1769)
Joseph Bagrationi (1769-1776)
Maxim II Abashidze (1776-1795)
Dositheus Tsereteli (de facto; 1795-1814)

Self-proclaimed Catholicoi of Abkhazia 

 Vissarion Aplaa as Primate of the Abkhazian Orthodox Church since 2009

References

Sources 

 АБХÁЗСКИЙ (ЗАПАДНОГРУЗИНСКИЙ) КАТОЛИКОСÁТ (по материалам статьи из «Православной энциклопедии». Т.1. М., 2000. С.67-72). Retrieved on May 2, 2007.
Dowling, Theodore Edward (originally published in London, 1912), Sketches of Georgian Church History. 
 M.F. Brosset, Essai chronologique sur la série des catholicos d'Aphkhazeth (lu le 22 septembre 1843), in: Bulletin de la classe des sciences historiques, philologiques et politiques de l'Académie Impériale des Sciences de Saint-Pétersbourg, t. I, No. 20/21, 1843, col. 305-324.

Early Modern history of Georgia (country)
Georgian Orthodox Church
1290 establishments in Europe
1814 disestablishments in Europe
History of Abkhazia